Joel Olwenyi (born 28 August 1980 in Kampala) is a Ugandan cricketer. He has represented Uganda 13 times in the ICC Trophy.

Captaincy 
In 2007 he captained his country in the ICC World Cricket League Division Three tournament which was held in Darwin, Australia. Uganda defeated Argentina in the final and earned promotion to division two.

External links
 

1980 births
Living people
Ugandan cricketers
Cricketers from Kampala